The 1986 Northern Ireland by-elections were fifteen by-elections held on 23 January 1986, to fill vacancies in the Parliament of the United Kingdom caused by the resignation in December 1985 of all sitting Unionist Members of Parliament (MPs). The MPs, from the Ulster Unionist Party, Democratic Unionist Party and Ulster Popular Unionist Party, did this to highlight their opposition to the Anglo-Irish Agreement.  Each of their parties agreed not to contest seats previously held by the others, and each outgoing MP stood for re-election.

Other candidates
Of the two Northern Ireland seats not held by unionists, Foyle was held by the nationalist Social Democratic and Labour Party (SDLP), while Belfast West was held by the republican party Sinn Féin. These MPs did not resign and their seats were not contested.

The SDLP and Sinn Féin regarded the resignations as a publicity stunt, and were reluctant to take part in the resulting by-elections. In the event, they contested only the seats which they believed to have an anti-unionist majority.

The Alliance Party of Northern Ireland instructed its branches to nominate a candidate for each by-election, but many were reluctant, and ultimately, the party stood in only five seats. The small Workers' Party stood in nine seats.

It appeared that the incumbent would be the only candidate in four constituencies. This would have produced the first uncontested elections for the House of Commons since the Armagh by-election of 1954. In order to ensure that there was a contest and that the Unionists would be able to demonstrate their point, Wesley Robert Williamson changed his name by deed poll to "Peter Barry", Peter Barry being Minister for Foreign Affairs of the Republic of Ireland. "Peter Barry" stood in these four constituencies under the label "For the Anglo-Irish Agreement", allowing a contest, but did not campaign.

The unusual circumstances led this to be the greatest number of UK parliamentary by-elections held on a single day.

Results

Aggregate results
The aggregated results for all constituencies are shown below. Changes are compared to those for the 15 constituencies in the 1983 general election.

|-

|- style="text-align:center; background-color:#F2F2F2;"
! style="border: 1px solid #aaa;" colspan=2 rowspan=2 | Political party
! style="border: 1px solid #aaa;"           rowspan=2 | Leader
! style="border: 1px solid #aaa;"           rowspan=2 | Position
! style="border: 1px solid #aaa;"           rowspan=2 | Candidates
! style="border: 1px solid #aaa;" colspan=5           | MPs
! style="border: 1px solid #aaa;" colspan=3           | Votes
|- style="text-align:center; background-color:#F2F2F2;"

! style="border: 1px solid #aaa;"                     | Total
! style="border: 1px solid #aaa;"                     | Gained
! style="border: 1px solid #aaa;"                     | Lost
! style="border: 1px solid #aaa;"                     | Net
! style="border: 1px solid #aaa;"                     | Of total(%)
! style="border: 1px solid #aaa;"                     | Total
! style="border: 1px solid #aaa;"                     | Of total(%)
! style="border: 1px solid #aaa;"                     | Change(%)
|-
| data-sort-value="Ulster Unionist Party" 
| style="border: 1px solid #aaa; text-align: left;" scope="row" | 
| style="border: 1px solid #aaa; text-align: left;" | 
| style="border: 1px solid #aaa;" | Anti-agreement
| style="border: 1px solid #aaa;" | 11
| style="border: 1px solid #aaa;" | 10
| style="border: 1px solid #aaa;" | 0
| style="border: 1px solid #aaa;" | 1
| style="border: 1px solid #aaa;" | 1
| style="border: 1px solid #aaa;" | 66.7
| style="border: 1px solid #aaa;" | 302,198
| style="border: 1px solid #aaa;" | 51.7
| style="border: 1px solid #aaa;" | 13.1
|-
| data-sort-value="Democratic Unionist Party" 
| style="border: 1px solid #aaa; text-align: left;" scope="row" | 
| style="border: 1px solid #aaa; text-align: left;" | 
| style="border: 1px solid #aaa;" | Anti-agreement
| style="border: 1px solid #aaa;" | 3
| style="border: 1px solid #aaa;" | 3
| style="border: 1px solid #aaa;" | 0
| style="border: 1px solid #aaa;" | 0
| style="border: 1px solid #aaa;" | 
| style="border: 1px solid #aaa;" | 20.0
| style="border: 1px solid #aaa;" | 85,239
| style="border: 1px solid #aaa;" | 14.6
| style="border: 1px solid #aaa;" | 5.5
|-
| data-sort-value="Social Democratic and Labour Party" 
| style="border: 1px solid #aaa; text-align: left;" scope="row" | 
| style="border: 1px solid #aaa; text-align: left;" | 
| style="border: 1px solid #aaa;" | Pro-agreement
| style="border: 1px solid #aaa;" | 4
| style="border: 1px solid #aaa;" | 1
| style="border: 1px solid #aaa;" | 1
| style="border: 1px solid #aaa;" | 0
| style="border: 1px solid #aaa;" | 1
| style="border: 1px solid #aaa;" | 6.7
| style="border: 1px solid #aaa;" | 70,917
| style="border: 1px solid #aaa;" | 12.1
| style="border: 1px solid #aaa;" | 3.1
|-
| data-sort-value="Sinn Féin" 
| style="border: 1px solid #aaa; text-align: left;" scope="row" | 
| style="border: 1px solid #aaa; text-align: left;" | 
| style="border: 1px solid #aaa;" | Anti-agreement
| style="border: 1px solid #aaa;" | 4
| style="border: 1px solid #aaa;" | 0
| style="border: 1px solid #aaa;" | 0
| style="border: 1px solid #aaa;" | 0
| style="border: 1px solid #aaa;" | 
| style="border: 1px solid #aaa;" | 0.0
| style="border: 1px solid #aaa;" | 38,848
| style="border: 1px solid #aaa;" | 6.6
| style="border: 1px solid #aaa;" | 4.7
|-
| data-sort-value="Alliance Party of Northern Ireland" 
| style="border: 1px solid #aaa; text-align: left;" scope="row" | 
| style="border: 1px solid #aaa; text-align: left;" | 
| style="border: 1px solid #aaa;" | Pro-agreement
| style="border: 1px solid #aaa;" | 5
| style="border: 1px solid #aaa;" | 0
| style="border: 1px solid #aaa;" | 0
| style="border: 1px solid #aaa;" | 0
| style="border: 1px solid #aaa;" | 
| style="border: 1px solid #aaa;" | 0.0
| style="border: 1px solid #aaa;" | 32,095
| style="border: 1px solid #aaa;" | 5.5
| style="border: 1px solid #aaa;" | 3.5
|-
| data-sort-value="Ulster Popular Unionist Party" 
| style="border: 1px solid #aaa; text-align: left;" scope="row" | 
| style="border: 1px solid #aaa; text-align: left;" | 
| style="border: 1px solid #aaa;" | Anti-agreement
| style="border: 1px solid #aaa;" | 1
| style="border: 1px solid #aaa;" | 1
| style="border: 1px solid #aaa;" | 0
| style="border: 1px solid #aaa;" | 0
| style="border: 1px solid #aaa;" | 
| style="border: 1px solid #aaa;" | 6.7
| style="border: 1px solid #aaa;" | 30,793
| style="border: 1px solid #aaa;" | 5.3
| style="border: 1px solid #aaa;" | 1.3
|-
| data-sort-value="Workers' Party (Ireland)" 
| style="border: 1px solid #aaa; text-align: left;" scope="row" | 
| style="border: 1px solid #aaa; text-align: left;" | 
| style="border: 1px solid #aaa;" | Pro-agreement
| style="border: 1px solid #aaa;" | 9
| style="border: 1px solid #aaa;" | 0
| style="border: 1px solid #aaa;" | 0
| style="border: 1px solid #aaa;" | 0
| style="border: 1px solid #aaa;" | 
| style="border: 1px solid #aaa;" | 0.0
| style="border: 1px solid #aaa;" | 18,148
| style="border: 1px solid #aaa;" | 3.1
| style="border: 1px solid #aaa;" | 1.3
|-
|
| For the Anglo-Irish Agreement
| style="border: 1px solid #aaa; text-align: left;" | Wesley Robert Williamson running as 'Peter Barry'
| style="border: 1px solid #aaa;" | Pro-agreement
| style="border: 1px solid #aaa;" | 4
| style="border: 1px solid #aaa;" | 0
| style="border: 1px solid #aaa;" | 0
| style="border: 1px solid #aaa;" | 0
| style="border: 1px solid #aaa;" | 
| style="border: 1px solid #aaa;" | 0.0
| style="border: 1px solid #aaa;" | 6,379
| style="border: 1px solid #aaa;" | 1.1
| style="border: 1px solid #aaa;" | N/A
|-
|- class="unsortable"
! style="border: 1px solid #aaa;" colspan=4 | Blank and invalid votes
!colspan=6 |
! style="border: 1px solid #aaa;"           | 
! style="border: 1px solid #aaa;"           | —
! style="border: 1px solid #aaa;"           | —
|- class="unsortable" style="background-color:#F2F2F2
! style="border: 1px solid #aaa;" colspan=4 | Total
! style="border: 1px solid #aaa;"           | 41
! style="border: 1px solid #aaa;"           | 15
! style="border: 1px solid #aaa;"           |
! style="border: 1px solid #aaa;"           |
! style="border: 1px solid #aaa;"           | 0
! style="border: 1px solid #aaa;"           | 100
! style="border: 1px solid #aaa;"           | 584,617
! style="border: 1px solid #aaa;"           | 100
! style="border: 1px solid #aaa;"           | 0.0
|- class="unsortable"
! style="border: 1px solid #aaa;" colspan=4 | Registered voters, and turnout
!colspan=6 |
! style="border: 1px solid #aaa;"           | 951,571
! style="border: 1px solid #aaa;"           | 61.44
! style="border: 1px solid #aaa;"           | 
|}

All but one of the Unionists were re-elected, many with extremely large majorities.  The largest of all went to Ian Paisley in North Antrim. He won 97.4% of the vote, the highest percentage polled by any candidate in a UK by-election since the 1940 Middleton and Prestwich by-election.

The sole exception to this pattern was the Newry and Armagh by-election, where Seamus Mallon of the SDLP was able to take the seat. Former Cabinet Minister Enoch Powell was able to narrowly survive a strong challenge from the SDLP in South Down and was subsequently defeated at the following year's general election.  In the western constituencies of Mid Ulster and Fermanagh and South Tyrone the Unionist candidates were able to survive with less than 50% of the vote due to a split Nationalist vote and both seats were gained by Sinn Féin in later elections.

The results of the fifteen by-elections were cited by Unionists as a rejection of the Agreement by the Northern Irish electorate, but did not succeed in repealing it.

Antrim

Belfast

Down

Newry and Armagh

Other constituencies

See also
 Lists of United Kingdom by-elections
 United Kingdom by-election records
 Five Constituencies Referendum
 July 2018 Australian federal by-elections

References

CAIN: Westminster By-Elections (NI) - Thursday 23 January 1986
Northern Ireland Elections: Westminster by-elections 1986

 
1986 elections in the United Kingdom
1986 elections in Northern Ireland
January 1986 events in the United Kingdom